The Punisher War Zone or Punisher War Zone is a comic book spin-off title featuring the Punisher, a fictional character published by Marvel Comics.

Publication history
The first installment of the series ran for 41 issues and two 64-page annuals. Multiple writers contributed to this series during its three-year run from 1992 to 1995. The series served mainly as a vehicle for longtime Marvel artist John Romita Jr., who had returned to Marvel after a lengthy hiatus from drawing a monthly title. In 2009, Marvel published a 6-issue limited series under the same title. The storyline was called "The Resurrection of Ma Gnucci".

Volume 1

The first series was the third different Punisher title published and the second spin-off.

Volume 2

This series was written by long-time Punisher writer Garth Ennis and drawn by long-time Punisher artist Steve Dillon. The series is a follow up to Ennis's other Marvel Knights Punisher series.

Volume 3

This series was written by Greg Rucka and is a follow up of Rucka's previous Punisher series from 2011. It was written to complete the story which Rucka did not get to do in the main title due to its cancellation.

Collected editions
 The Punisher: War Zone, Vol. 1 (collects The Punisher War Zone #1-6), September 2002, 
 The Punisher: Barbarian with a Gun (collects The Punisher War Zone #26-30), November 2008, 
 The Punisher: River of Blood (collects The Punisher War Zone #31-36), December 2005, 
 Punisher: War Zone - The Resurrection of Ma Gnucci (collects Punisher: War Zone vol. 2, #1-6), April 2009,  (HC), August 2009,  (TPB)
 Punisher: Enter the War Zone (Collects ''Punisher: War Zone Vol. 3 #1-5), June 2013,

See also
 1992 in comics
 2013 in comics

References

External links
 
 
 

Comics set in New York City